Murray Crossley Greason (December 26, 1900 – January 1, 1960) was an American college basketball and baseball coach.  He earned 12 athletic letters as a student-athlete at Wake Forest University in baseball, basketball and football from 1922 to 1926.

After graduation, Greason became a coach at Lexington High School in North Carolina.  In 1934, he became head basketball coach at his alma mater, Wake Forest, to start a tenure that would last 23 seasons, during which time he compiled a record of 288–244.  Greason won a Southern Conference regular season title in 1939, and a tournament title in 1953.  He was also named Southern Conference Coach of the Year that season.  He led Wake Forest into the Atlantic Coast Conference as a charter member in 1954 and in 1956 was named ACC Coach of the Year.  Greason also coached the Wake Forest baseball team from 1940–1947.

Greason was killed in an automobile accident on January 1, 1960.

Head coaching record

College basketball

References

1900 births
1960 deaths
American football halfbacks
American men's basketball coaches
American men's basketball players
Baseball players from Raleigh, North Carolina
Basketball coaches from North Carolina
Basketball players from Raleigh, North Carolina
College men's basketball head coaches in the United States
High school basketball coaches in the United States
Players of American football from Raleigh, North Carolina
Sportspeople from Raleigh, North Carolina
Wake Forest Demon Deacons baseball coaches
Wake Forest Demon Deacons baseball players
Wake Forest Demon Deacons football players
Wake Forest Demon Deacons men's basketball coaches
Wake Forest Demon Deacons men's basketball players